Dolinka is a rural locality (a selo) in Novokulundinsky Selsoviet, Blagoveshchensky District, Altai Krai, Russia. The population was 357 as of 2013. It was founded in 1912. There are 2 streets.

Geography 
Dolinka is located 39 km northeast of Blagoveshchenka (the district's administrative centre) by road. Novokulundinka is the nearest rural locality.

References 

Rural localities in Blagoveshchensky District, Altai Krai